The  is a 2.3 km railway line owned by the Kumamoto Electric Railway, serving Kumamoto City, Kumamoto Prefecture, Japan. The line branches southward from Kita-Kumamoto Station to Fujisakigū-mae Station.

Previously, this line extended to Kami-Kumamoto Station on one side and Kikuchi on the other. The section between Kita-Kumamoto and Kikuchi was transferred to the Kikuchi Line on October 1, 1950, and the section between Fujisakigū-mae ad Kami-Kumamoto was transferred to the Kumamoto City Tram as the Tsuboi Line on June 1, 1954. The Tsuboi Line ceased operations in 1970.

Operations
The line is electrified  with overhead lines and is single-tracked for the entire line. Passing loops are located at Kita-Kumamoto Station for trains continuing on the Kikuchi Line.

All passenger services on the line continue past Kita-Kumamoto Station to Miyoshi Station on the Kikuchi Line. Trains arrive roughly every thirty minutes.

Stations

References

Kumamoto Electric Railway Fujisaki Line
Railway lines in Japan
Rail transport in Kumamoto Prefecture
Railway lines opened in 1913
Japanese third-sector railway lines